Francesco Cerabona (Aliano, 9 December 1882 – Naples, 26 July 1963) was an Italian politician, who served as Minister of Communications of the Kingdom of Italy in the Badoglio II and Bonomi II Cabinets, and as Minister of Transport in the Bonomi III Cabinet.

Biography

Born in the province of Matera, Cerabona had graduated in law and worked as a lawyer. Having joined the Italian Socialist Party, he ran without success in the 1913 elections but was elected to the Italian Chamber of Deputies in 1919 and again in 1921. 

After the twenty-year "pause" imposed by the Fascist regime, he returned to politics in 1943, with the Labour Democratic Party, and was appointed Minister of Communications in the Badoglio II Cabinet, from April to June 1944, and confirmed in this post by the subsequent Bonomi II Cabinet, from June to December 1944. 

When the Ministry of Transport, which had been suppressed and merged into the Ministry of Public Works in 1920, was re-established under the Bonomi III Cabinet, Cerabona was given this post, from December 1944 to June 1945; in this capacity he had to deal with the reconstruction of the Italian railway network, severely damaged by the war. 

After the war, having returned to the Italian Socialist Party, he was a member of the Italian National Council and was then elected to the Chamber of Deputies of the Italian Republic in 1948 and to the Senate in 1953 and again in 1958.  He died in 1963, shortly after the end of his second term in the Senate.

References

1882 births
1963 deaths
Government ministers of Italy
Italian Socialist Party politicians
Transport ministers of Italy
Deputies of Legislature I of Italy
Senators of Legislature II of Italy
Senators of Legislature III of Italy
Deputies of Legislature XXV of the Kingdom of Italy
Deputies of Legislature XXVI of the Kingdom of Italy
Members of the National Council (Italy)

it:Francesco Cerabona
arz:فرانسيسكو سيرابونا